Aguedo Mojica Marrero (1908–1981) was a Puerto Rican politician, lawyer and educator. He is noted for his academic work.

Early years and studies

Aguedo Mojica was born on March 16, 1908, in Humacao, Puerto Rico. He studied at the University of Puerto Rico, Río Piedras Campus where he was doctored in philosophy and later in law from the University of Puerto Rico School of Law. He was also a law professor at the same institution. He worked as a professor at the University of Puerto Rico, as a professor of Latin, in 1943, and thereafter taught philosophical chair. He earned a Doctor degree in Law philosophy from the Complutense University of Madrid and another Doctor degree in Philosophy and Letters from Paris-Sorbonne University.

Politics

Retired for a few from his academic career and took a position as a At-Large member of the Puerto Rico House of Representatives from 1957 to 1968 that included a stint as Speaker pro tempore of the House of Representatives of Puerto Rico from 1965 to 1968.

Personal life and legacy

Aguedo Mojica died on June 19, 1981. Had many awards and recognitions for his academic career. The library at the University of Puerto Rico at Humacao was named after Aguedo Mojica for one of the legislators of the law that created the regional colleges of the University of Puerto Rico. The center of fine arts in Humacao was also named after him.

References

1908 births
1981 deaths
Complutense University of Madrid alumni
Paris-Sorbonne University alumni
People from Humacao, Puerto Rico
Puerto Rican academics
Popular Democratic Party members of the House of Representatives of Puerto Rico
University of Puerto Rico alumni
University of Puerto Rico faculty
20th-century American politicians